Tsarevich is a Slavic title given to tsars' sons.

Tsarevich may also refer to:
 Ivan Tsarevich, a hero of Russian folklore
 Tsarevich (Fabergé egg), a 1912 Fabergé egg
 The Tsarevich (1929 film), a 1929 German silent historical film
 The Tsarevich (1933 film), a 1933 German historical musical film
 Russian battleship Tsarevich

See also 
 Tsarevich Ivan (disambiguation)